Maia Kristiane Agerup (born June 22, 1995) is a Norwegian Olympic Sailor. She represents the Royal Norwegian Yacht Club in Oslo.

Together with her twin sister Ragna Agerup she sailed the Olympic Class boat 49erFX competed in the 2016 Rio Olympics.

In June 2016 the team was ranked 15th on the ISAF World Ranking. Their best ranking position is 4th, from December 2012. After competing in the Olympics, Maia started her education at Boston University, where she graduated in 2020.

She has previously sailed Optimist Dinghy and 29er.

Junior career

2010 - Silver. Norwegian Championship, Optimist

2010 - Gold. Norwegian Championship Teams Racing. (KNS - Ragna Agerup, Line Flem Høst, Sophie Tjøm)

2013 - Gold. Norwegian Championship, 29er

2013 - 12th place and winner of the Female Class. 29er World Championship. Aarhus, Denmark

2013 - 4th place. 29er EuroCup Overall  (Best Female Team)

Senior career

2014 - Gold. ISAF World Cup, 49erFX. Melbourne, Australia

2015 - 9th place. European Championship, 49erFX. Porto, Portugal

2015 - Bronze. U23 World Championship, 49erFX. Flensburg, Germany

2016 - 4th place. ISAF World Cup, 49erFX. Miami, USA

2016 - 5th place. ISAF World Cup, 49erFX. Weymouth, United Kingdom

2017 - Silver. ISAF World Cup, 49erFX. Miami, USA

2017 - Gold. Junior World Championship 49erFX. Kingston, Canada

2017 - 8th place. European Championship, 49erFX. Kiel, Germany

2018 - Silver. ISAF World Cup, 49erFX. Miami, USA

References

 http://www.olympiatoppen.no/om_olympiatoppen/aktuelt/page8501.html
 https://members.sailing.org/sailors/biog.php?memberid=335341

1995 births
Living people
Sportspeople from Oslo
Norwegian female sailors (sport)
Olympic sailors of Norway
Sailors at the 2016 Summer Olympics – 49er FX
Twin sportspeople
Norwegian twins
Norwegian sportswomen
21st-century Norwegian women